Thomas Erle Drax (1721 – December 1789) was an English Tory politician. He served as a Member of Parliament for constituencies in Dorset in the 18th century. He was the son of Henry Drax, British MP and owner of slave plantations in Barbados and Jamaica.

Political career 
Drax was MP for Corfe Castle from 1744 to 1747, and went on to be MP for Wareham between 1761 and March 1768.

Slave ownership 

Drax owned plantations in Barbados and Jamaica, and he represented the interests of the planter class in the House of Commons.

Personal life 
He was a member of the Plunkett-Ernle-Erle-Drax family and lived at Charborough House.

References

Further reading 
 Charborough House

1721 births
1789 deaths
British MPs 1741–1747
British MPs 1761–1768
Drax family
Members of the Parliament of Great Britain for English constituencies
Members of the Parliament of Great Britain for Wareham
Politicians from Dorset
People from Wareham, Dorset
Tory MPs (pre-1834)